Pseudopachylebia relucens is a species of beetle in the family Carabidae, the only species in the genus Pseudopachylebia.

References

Lebiinae